Holckenhus is a late 19th-century, residential perimeter block located between Dantes Plads (Nos. 2–6), H. C. Andersens Boulevard (No. 33), Vester Voldgade (Nos. 86–90) and Stormgade (No. 35) in central Copenhagen, Denmark. The lofts of the four corner pavilions contained studio space and dwellings for artists. Artists who have lived and worked in the building include Peder Severin Krøyer, Emil Nolde and Bertha Wegmann.

History
Holckenhus is located in the grounds of Copenhagen's former West Rampart and takes its name from Holck's Bastion, which used to be located at the site.

The building was constructed for Foreningen Socialt Boligbyggeri in 1891–93. It was designed by Philip Smidth.

Architecture
The building was designed with inspiration from French Renaissance architecture. The two lower floors have granite rustication. The upper floors stand in blank red brick with decorations in painted cement. French Renaissance architecture was also a source of inspiration for other prominent development projects in Copenhagen, such as Søtorvet and Magasin du Nord.

Artist's studios
 
 
The lofts of the four corner pavilions contain studio facilities and dwellings for artists. A number of prominent artists have lived and worked in the building. Peder Severin Krøyer and Marie Krøyer had their winter home in the building from its completion in 1892 but continued to spend the summers at Skagen. Emil Nolde lived in the building during his stay in Copenhagen in 1900–01. Bertha Wegmann and Agnes and Harald Slott-Møller have also lived and worked in the building.

Kristian Zahrtmann operated a painting school from the premises in the early 1900s. It has previously been based in Prior's Atelier Building at Vredgade 33.

More recent residents include Jens Birkemose, Maria Wandel, Carl Krull, Peter Bonén and Jesper Langberg.

References

Further reading
 Architekten, V, 1898-99, page 114
 Millech, Knud and Fisker, Kay: Danske Arkitekturstrømninger 1850-1950, Østifternes Kreditforening, 1951.

External links 

 Image
 Source
 Source

Apartment buildings in Copenhagen
Artists' studios in Copenhagen
Renaissance Revival architecture in Copenhagen
Residential buildings completed in 1783